Leszek Zadlo (born 4 April 1945) is a Polish jazz musician (soprano saxophone, tenor saxophone, flute), composer, and university teacher.

Life and work 
Zadlo was born in Kraków, Poland. He studied music in Kraków, Vienna, and Graz. In the mid-1960s, after he had already worked as a jazz musician in Kraków, he moved to Vienna, where he founded the International Quartet. At the end of the 1960s he joined the Group, a group of improvisational performers at the Musikhochschule Graz, where he taught Swedish trombonist Eje Thelin.

From the early to mid-1970s Zadlo was a member of both the ORF big band and the Erich Kleinschuster sextet. He also appeared in productions alongside Dexter Gordon, Friedrich Gulda, Dusko Goykovich, and Michał Urbaniak. As part of the Leszek Zadlo Ensemble, he played with trumpeter Johannes Faber and pianist Bob Degen. (The ensemble currently includes Bill Elgart and Paulo Cardoso.) Zadlo also played in Ali Haurand's European Jazz Quintet, along with his fellow saxophonists Alan Skidmore and Gerd Dudek.

In 1983 Zadlo founded the Polski Jazz Ensemble with Vladislav Sendecki, Bronisław Suchanek, and Janusz Stefański. Jazz & Lyrik Productions The Waltz end of the world (1985) was also involved in the ensemble. Zadlo repeatedly played in churches on productions of Südwestfunk with organist Claus Bantzer. These productions were produced by Joachim-Ernst Berendt.

Zadlo has also worked with Klaus Weiss, Volker Kriegel, Bobby Star, Rimona Francis, Günter Lenz, Michael Naura, Werner Pirchner, Chris Beier, Rainer Glas, and Biréli Lagrène. As a guest soloist, he has been involved in numerous big-band productions, such as Experimenti Berlin with Thad Jones, Slide Hampton, and Martin Schrack. He has also helped form Norddeutscher Rundfunk, Westdeutscher Rundfunk and the RIAS.

Zadlo has taught at the University of Music Würzburg since 1986 and was appointed professor in 2003. In addition, he composed film music. In 1985, he contributed to the film Men..., by Doris Dörrie. His playing style is distinguished by melancholic sounding lyricism, in spite of the harmonic and linear freedom of a post-John Coltrane saxophonist.

Discography 

 1973: Inner Silence, the Leszek Zadlo Ensemble, with Butch Kellem, Dick Sells, Gerhard Herrmann, and Peter Ponger
 1976: Thoughts, Leszek Zadlo, with Joe Haider, Isla Eckinger, and Joe Nay
 1977: Time Emit, Leszek Zadlo, with Johannes Faber, Bob Degen, Gary Todd, and Joe Nay
 1980: Sting, Leszek Zadlo, with Bob Degen, Günter Lenz, and Joe Nay)
 1984: As Time Went by, Overtone featuring Leszek Zadlo, with Chris Beier, Rainer Glass, and Rudolf Roth
 1987: Tour de France, the Leszek Zadlo Ensemble, with Chris Beier, Rainer Glass, and Jurek Bezucha
 1989: Breath, the Leszek Zadlo Ensemble, with Chris Beier, Rainer Glass, and Bill Elgart
 1990: Springtime in Winter, Leszek Zadlo, Harold Rubin, and Pharpar
 1994: Space, Rainer Glass, Chris Beier, and Leszek Zadlo
 1995: Illumination: Improvisations for Saxophone and Organ, Leszek Zadlo and Claus Bantzer
 2006: The Jazz Age Ensemble with Rainer Glass, Bernhard Pichl, Harald Rüschenbaum, Torsten Goods, and Andrei Lobanov
 2010: Universal: The Rainbow Suite, the Rainer Glass Ensemble, with Johannes Faber, Jörg Widmoser, Peter O'Mara Jan Miserre, Carola Grey, Biboul Darouiche, and Peter Knoll

Bibliography 
 Wolf Kampmann: Reclams Jazzlexikon, Stuttgart 2003,

References

External links 
 Official German page

Jazz saxophonists
Jazz flautists
Polish jazz composers
Male jazz composers
Schoolteachers from Kraków
Polish jazz musicians
Polish emigrants to Germany
1945 births
Living people
Musicians from Kraków
21st-century saxophonists
21st-century male musicians
European Jazz Ensemble members
21st-century flautists